"Winter Love" is BoA's 21st Japanese single. It was released on November 1, 2006. It hit #2 on the Oricon Charts with sales of 42,481, making it the highest charting BoA single since "Do the Motion", which was released in March 2005. Formats are 「CD+DVD」 and 「CD only」.The single was released just before her twentieth birthday (November 5, 2006).

This single has met with success compared to her last single "Key of Heart / Dotch", and has outsold "Nanairo no Ashita: Brand New Beat / Your Color".

Her song "Candle Lights" was used as the ending theme of Japanese dub version of Korean film A Millionaire's First Love.

Track listing

CD

First Press Edition
 Winter Love
 Candle Lights
 Last Christmas (Bonus track)
 Winter Love (TV Mix)
 Candle Lights (TV Mix)

Regular Edition
 Winter Love
 Candle Lights
 Winter Love (TV Mix)
 Candle Lights (TV Mix)

DVD
 Winter Love (PV)

TV performances
October 25, 2006 — Hey! Hey! Hey!
October 27, 2006 — PopJam
October 28, 2006 — CDTV
October 29, 2006 — MUSIC EXPRESS
October 29, 2006 — Utawara
November 3, 2006 — Music Fighter
November 3, 2006 — Music Station
November 5, 2006 — BoA The Live 20th Birthday Special Event
November 25, 2006 — MelodiX!
December 2, 2006 — Music Fair 21 ("Winter Love" and "Meri Kuri")

Charts
"Winter Love" debuted at #2 on Oricon Daily Singles Chart, but rose to #1 on its fourth day out. It landed at #2 on the weekly charts, being kept out of number one by a narrow 3,814 copies. Its total sales outsold the number one single's total sales that week. The single's debut sales and position were very high, compared to her previous single "Key of Heart / Dotch", which had low sales due to poor promotion by her record label, Avex Trax. Despite of competitions with many other major new releases, this single had continued its success. It sold double the amount of "Key of Heart / Dotch's" total sales, and outsold "Nanairo no Ashita: Brand New Beat / Your Color".

'''Oricon Sales Chart

References 
http://www.avexnet.or.jp/boa/

2006 singles
2006 songs
BoA songs
Avex Trax singles
Pop ballads
Song articles with missing songwriters